Ngũ Hành Sơn is a district (quận) of Da Nang in the South Central Coast region of Vietnam.

The district is divided into four wards (phường):

 Mỹ An
 Khuê Mỹ
 Hòa Hải
 Hòa Quý

As of 2003, the district had a population of 50,105. The district covers an area of 37 km². The district capital lies at Khuê Mỹ ward.

References

Districts of Da Nang